The Man Who Changed His Mind is a 1936 British science fiction horror film starring Boris Karloff and Anna Lee. It was directed by Robert Stevenson and was produced by Gainsborough Pictures. The film was also known as The Brainsnatcher or The Man Who Lived Again.

Plot
Dr. Laurience (Karloff), a once-respectable scientist, begins to research the origins of the mind and soul in an isolated manor house, aided only by the promising surgeon Clare Wyatt (Lee) and a wheelchair-using confederate named Clayton (Donald Calthrop). The scientific community rejects his theories and Laurience risks losing everything for which he has worked so obsessively. To save his research, Laurience (pronounced "Lorenz") begins to use his discoveries in brain transference for his own nefarious purposes, replacing the mind of philanthropist Lord Haslewood (Frank Cellier) with the personality of the crippled, caustic Clayton. With Lord Haslewood's wealth and prestige at his command, Laurience becomes an almost unstoppable mad scientist.

Despite a powerful patron and a state-of-the-art laboratory, chain-smoking Laurience remains the typical absent-minded professor, with eraser dust on the back of his wrinkled jacket, and in constant, desperate need of a strong hairbrush. However, he is not immune to the feminine charms of the lovely Dr. Wyatt. He attempts to take control of the body of Lord Haslewood's handsome son Dick (John Loder) in an effort to seduce Clare, but finds it impossible to disguise his own strange physicality even in the body of another man. Nor can he go without a cigarette in front of Clare although he is aware that young Dick Haslewood never smoked.  Unfortunately, before transferring his mind with that of Dick, Laurience strangled Clayton, who was inhabiting the body of Lord Haslewood, so that Dick, afterwards a prisoner in Laurience's own body, would be hanged for the murder of the man presumed to be his father.

Realizing the truth, Clare and her friend Dr. Gratton (Cecil Parker) return Laurience's mind to its proper body, but that body has been badly broken in a panicked fall out of a high window, taken while Dick Haslewood was in unwilling possession. Admitting he has wasted an incredible invention on a selfish and murderous scheme, the shattered Laurience tells Clare he should never have meddled with the human soul. He takes his knowledge to the grave, having changed his mind for the last time.

Cast
 Boris Karloff as Dr. Laurience / Dick Haslewood
 Anna Lee as Dr. Clare Wyatt
 John Loder as Dick Haslewood / Dr. Laurience
 Frank Cellier as Lord Haslewood / Clayton
 Donald Calthrop as Clayton / Lord Haslewood
 Cecil Parker as Dr. Gratton
 Lyn Harding as Prof. Holloway
 Clive Morton as Journalist  
 D.J. Williams as Landlord

See also
 Boris Karloff filmography

References

External links

1936 films
1930s science fiction horror films
British science fiction horror films
1930s English-language films
Films directed by Robert Stevenson
Films produced by Michael Balcon
Gainsborough Pictures films
Islington Studios films
British black-and-white films
Films set in London
1936 horror films
1930s British films
Films with screenplays by John L. Balderston
Films set in country houses
Mad scientist films